DeGrazia is a surname. Notable people with the surname include:
 (born 1959), Venezuelan politician and National Assembly deputy
David DeGrazia (born 1962), American moral philosopher
Domingo DeGrazia, American politician
Ettore DeGrazia (1909–1982), American painter, sculptor, composer, actor, director, designer, architect, jeweler, and lithographer
Margreta de Grazia (born 1946), Shakespeare scholar
Sebastian de Grazia, (1917–2000) was an American author